Mats Bjurman (born March 9, 1994) is a Swedish American soccer player.

Career
Bjurman played college soccer at UC Irvine between 2012 and 2015.

While at college, Bjurman also appeared for Premier Development League side Orange County Blues U-23.

Bjurman signed with United Soccer League club Orange County Blues on March 29, 2016.

On November 22, 2016 Saint Louis FC has agreed to a contract with midfielder Octavio Guzman, defender Wesley Charpie, and midfielder Mats Bjurman, pending United Soccer League and United States Soccer Federation approval.

References

External links
 

1994 births
Living people
American soccer players
Association football midfielders
National Premier Soccer League players
Orange County SC players
Saint Louis FC players
Soccer players from California
Sportspeople from Irvine, California
UC Irvine Anteaters men's soccer players
USL Championship players
USL League Two players